Official U.S. PlayStation Magazine (often abbreviated to OPM) was a monthly video game magazine, published by Ziff Davis Media. It was a sister publication of Electronic Gaming Monthly. The magazine focused exclusively on PlayStation hardware, software, and culture, covering the original PlayStation, PlayStation 2, PlayStation 3 and PlayStation Portable. Each issue included a disc that contained playable demos and videos of PlayStation games. The magazine had a nearly ten-year run. The first issue, cover dated October 1997, was published September 23, 1997, while the final issue was cover dated January 2007.

After OPM was discontinued in January 2007, the independent PlayStation magazine PSM became PlayStation: The Official Magazine in December 2007, replacing OPM as the official magazine focusing on Sony game consoles.

Staff
The final incarnation of the OPM staff included:
 Editor-in-chief – Tom Byron
 Managing editor – Dana Jongewaard
 Senior editor – Joe Rybicki
 Previews editor – Thierry "Scooter" Nguyen
 News editor – Giancarlo Varanini
 Art director – Ryan Vulk
 Associate art director – Alejandro Chavetta
 Disc editor – Logan Parr
 Editorial director – John Davison
Past members included: 
 Senior Art Director - Bob Conlon
 Managing editor – Gary Steinman
 Managing editor – Din Perez
 Managing editor – Dan Peluso
 Reviews editor – Chris Baker
 Associate editor – Mark MacDonald
 Editor-in-chief – Wataru Maruyama
 Editor-in-chief – Kraig Kujawa
 Editor-in-chief – John Davison

Demo discs
OPM was the first gaming magazine to include a disc that featured playable demos of PlayStation games. Beginning with issue one, each magazine came with a disc containing playable PlayStation game demos and non-playable video footage. Later, interviews, industry event coverage, and video walkthroughs of games would also be included on the discs. Beginning with issue 49 (October 2001), the magazine came with a PlayStation 2 demo disc, though for a time it would still be alternated with original PlayStation demo discs. Issues 50, 52, and 54 were the last issues to include demo discs for the original PlayStation.  All of the demo discs were developed by LifeLike Productions, Inc.

OPM had released one PlayStation Portable demo, Killzone Liberation. It was available only with the purchase of retail copies rather than subscription issues. The magazine was discontinued before making the assumed transition to PlayStation 3 demo discs.

International editions
Similar international editions of the magazine exist in Sweden, Finland, the United Kingdom, the Republic of Ireland, Germany, France, Italy, Spain, Belgium, Portugal, Brazil and Australia. The Belgian edition is also published in the Netherlands.

The Australian edition was originally published by Next Media bi-monthly, but eventually became a monthly magazine. APC published the magazine after issue 18. It is currently published by Derwent Howard and is edited by Narayan Pattison.

References

External links
 Official Website (Archived)
OPM at 1UP.com
 PlayStation® Network
 PlayStation®
 RadiOPM at 1UP.com (official podcast)

Staff blogs
 Editor in Chief, Tom Byron
 Managing Editor, Dana Jongewaard
 Senior Editor, Joe Rybicki
 Previews Editor, Thierry "Scooter" Nguyen
 News Editor, Giancarlo Varanini

1997 establishments in California
2007 disestablishments in California
Monthly magazines published in the United States
Video game magazines published in the United States
Defunct computer magazines published in the United States
Magazines established in 1997
Magazines disestablished in 2007
Magazines published in San Francisco
PlayStation (brand) magazines